Immigrants (Hungarian title: Immigrants - Jóska menni Amerika) is a 2008 adult animated comedy film directed by Gábor Csupó. It is also known as L.A. Dolce Vita or Immigrants: L.A. Dolce Vita. It is the fifth and (to date) final feature-length film from the studio Klasky Csupo, and the first and only feature-length animated movie that was directed by Csupo.

The characters and story line in this film were the basis for a new animated series for Spike TV, which was scheduled to debut in August 2004. However, despite scheduling a two-hour marathon for the series premiere and ordering an additional six episodes, the series never aired due to the decline of animation programming on Spike TV. It was later compiled into a film and released on October 30, 2008, in Hungary. The film was also going to be released by Paramount Pictures, but they declined the offer after parent company Viacom's contract with Klasky Csupo expired in 2007.

In America, the film was released on Region 1 DVD in 2009 by Echo Bridge Home Entertainment.

Plot 
Joska, a Hungarian immigrant in Los Angeles, shares an apartment with Vladislav, a Russian immigrant. In their quest for the "American Dream," they encounter all kinds of troubles, wild adventures, and comical situations. The pair are routinely saved by their big hearts and loyalty to each other in this unlikely tale of friendship in a foreign country.

Characters 
 Vladislav is a Russian immigrant who has a teenage daughter, Anya. He desperately seeks to land a job to support his daughter and Jóska.
 Jóska is a Hungarian immigrant and is a roommate of Vladislav. Unlike his friend, he is somewhat familiar with US culture.
 Anya is Vladislav's daughter who tries to fit in as a normal teenager such as getting a tattoo.
 Flaco is Vladislav and Jóska's Hispanic friend who lives with his wife.
 Nazam is the Pakistani immigrant father of four daughters and his only son who works as a celebrity bus driver for tourists.
 Rashid is a Pakistani teenager who lives with his father Nazam, he is also a brother to four sisters and friend of Anya and Min.
 Chea is Min's father who owns a Chinese restaurant where everything costs one-dollar.
 Min is Chea's Chinese daughter, and Anya's friend, who works in her father's restaurant.
 Splits is a black African neighbor of Jóska and Vladislav. He routinely informs anyone who will listen that he had sex with a thousand women.
 Greta Night is the old landlady of the foreign occupants. She is attracted to Vladislav and occasionally offers to marry him to extend his stay in America (while also offering to "jumpstart his sex life"). She also threatens to call immigration whenever her residents do anything of which she disapproves.

Voice cast

Hungarian Original Version

Cast
 Ferenc Hujber as Joska
 Győző Szabó as Vlad
 Szonja Oroszlán as Anya
 Titanilla Bogdányi as Min Chea
 Gábor Reviczky as Splits Jackson
 Imre Józsa as Mr. Chea
 Zolee Ganxsta as Flaco
 József Kerekes as Nazam Kazmi
 Levente Molnár as Rashid Kazmi
 Judit Hernádi as Greta Knight

Supporting Cast
 Sándor Fábry as Businessman
 Zsóka Kapocs as Christina Aguilera
 Ferenc Rákóczi as Hentes (Butcher)
 Aranka Halász as Madame Loo
 István Szellő as TV Reporter
 András Both as Doorman
 István Kovács as Doorman Trainer
 Péter Kálloy-Molnár as Glutco Manager
 Jozsef Lang as Sam
 Iván Kamarás as Bar Owner

English Dubbed Version

Cast
 Hank Azaria as Joska
 Eric McCormack as Vlad
 Milana Vayntrub as Anya
 Lauren Tom as Min Chea
 Carl Lumbly as Splits Jackson
 Freddy Rodriguez as Flaco
 Ahmed Ahmed as Nazam Kazmi
 Vik Sahay as Rashid Kazmi
 Patti Deutsch as Greta Knight

Supporting Cast
 Quinton Flynn as TV Reporter, Hermaphrodite, Glutco Manager, Businessman
 Karen Maruyama as Madame Loo
 Laraine Newman as Lady #2, Nurse
 Christina Pickles as Harriet
 Freddy Rodriguez as Crutches Guy
 Tom Kenny as Craig, Courier
 Dan Castellaneta as Bar Owner
 Ed O'Ross as Officer Kaufman
 Natalija Nogulich as Angry Tenant
 Takayo Fischer as Japanese Woman
 Ahmed Ahmed as Monk
 Jack Angel as Longshoreman
 Scott Menville as Diseased Guy, Frat Boy
 Vik Sahay as Band Leader, Cheesy Guy
 Will Shin as Gangbanger
 Erv Immerman as Mr. Witte
 Lynne Maclean as Mrs. Richie
 Mick Murray as Charlie
 Dave Walsh as Mouqard
 Stacey Ferguson as Christina Aguilera, Skinny Woman
 Bret Csupo as Woman 1-2
 Jen Alexander as Gloureus Woman
 Nick Dickinson as Tattoo Guy
 Jeremy Ratchford as Tattoo Artist
 Marc Jordan as Detective
 Tema Bonita as Exotic Lady
 Mark DeCarlo as Butcher
 James Harmon as Mr. Lowham
 Diane Michelle as Ms. Lowham, Binkie Lady
 Jeff Bennett as Health Inspector
 Michael J. Gough as Counter Clerk
 Andre Ware as Customer, Bus Rider #2
 Rodney Saulsberry as Paramedic
 Lauren Tom as Lady #1
 Marabina Jaimes as Lady #3
 Jim Ward as Doctor, Bus Rider #3
 Hope Levy as Bus Rider #1
 Courtenay Taylor as Sexy Nurse
 Candi Milo as Waitress, Teen Girl #1
 Gregg Berger as Sam
 Rino Romano as Yoga Teacher
 Kimberly Brooks as Teen Girl #2
 Kevin Michael Richardson as Doorman
 Mikey Kelley as DJ
 Dee Bradley Baker as Steve The Pig
 Dorie Burton as Ms. Binkie, Redless Club
 Vaikette Hoffman as Blind Club
 Tasia Valenza as Coffee Cashier
 Cristina Pucelli as Valley Girl
 Rene Auberjonois as Doorman Trainer
 Hank Azaria as Sylvester
 Frank Welker as Indian General
 Lambardo Boyar as Dishwasher, Alto
 Jesse Corti as Bass

References

External links 

Official site

2008 films
2008 animated films
2000s American animated films
American adult animated films
American animated comedy films
2000s English-language films
Films directed by Gábor Csupó
Hungarian animated films
2000s Hungarian-language films
Klasky Csupo animated films